Enfusion is a Dutch kickboxing promotion company based in Alkmaar, Netherlands. It produces events worldwide, which showcase twelve kickboxing weight classes (7 male and 5 female). Enfusion held its first event in 2013 in the Zwembad Sporthal in Zwevegem, Belgium. Aside from producing kickboxing events inside of a ring, Enfusion operates three other brands of events: Enfusion Talents, which showcases up and coming kickboxing prospects, Enfusion Rookies where amateurs are allowed to demonstrate their skills for the talent scouts and Enfusion Reality, a tournament with behind the scenes perspectives into each athlete, produced over 12–14 episodes.

History

In 2002 Edwin Van Os started a new company along with Partner Simon Rutz designed to market kickboxing and manage fighters under the name of Its Showtime.

In 2012, Its Showtime was then sold to Glory.

Edwin van Os of Its Showtime then started a new reality show concept called Enfusion Reality which first aired in 2010. In 2013 the next step of Enfusion development emerged by hosting fight events throughout Europe and abroad.

In 2018 Enfusion begun organizing Enfusion MMA events.

In 2019 Enfusion unveiled two new brands with Enfusion Cage Events (ECE). The two brands included MMA and Extreme Stand-up.

Media coverage
Enfusion events were previously broadcast on Viceland in the Netherlands, while viewers elsewhere could watch through Enfusion's own subscription based video service.

February 2022 a streaming deal covering Germany, Switzerland and Austria with fighting.de was announced.
March 2022 Viaplay announced that they had acquired rights to stream Enfusion events for the next three years.

Glory Rivals
In January 2022 Enfusion and Glory announced a new series of jointly promoted events called Glory Rivals. The inaugural Rivals event was scheduled for May 21, 2022 at the Lotto Arena in Antwerp, Belgium. The event was later cancelled due to the finances of Enfusion's local promoter partner Antwerp Fight Organization catching the attention of Belgian authorities. The first Rivals event was then held on 11 June 2022 in Alkmaar.

Kickboxing rules

Clothing and equipment
Each athlete wears a pair of shorts, and is not allowed to wear shoes. Female fighters additionally wear a top. The athletes fight with 8 oz gloves if they are under 70 kg and 10 oz gloves if they are above 70 kg. They must wear a gumshield and groin protector. Vaseline is applied only to the face, while it is prohibited to apply it to the neck, shoulders and other body parts.

Duration of the rounds
Fighters in the A and B classes contest three rounds of three minutes each, with a minute's rest between the rounds. If the fight is scored a draw, they are allowed to fight a maximum of one extra round. Enfusion title fights, Super Bouts and Elimination fights (fight between contenders for a title shot) are five rounds of three minutes, with a minute of rest between the rounds. There is no extra round in these types of fights as a draw is not possible.

Female title fights are five rounds of two minutes each. A draw is likewise not possible.

Permitted techniques
Punches are allowed to the head, front and side of the upper body. Spinning back fists are allowed, but they must not connect with the side of the glove. Kicks are allowed to the head, front and side of the neck, chest and stomach, as well as to the side of the body, kicks to the arms, inside and outside of the legs, and push kicks to the upper leg and thighs. Push kicks to the knee are not allowed.

Sweeps to the supporting leg of the opponent with the shin or the top of the foot are allowed.

Knees are permitted to the head, chest, sides, stomach and legs.

Clinch fighting is allowed to go on as long as the fighters are perceived to be active and working. Should the referee judge the clinch to be inactive, he will break up the fighters.

The following are considered to be fouls: Holding in the clinch to avoid striking, head butting, elbow strikes, strikes to the groin, push kicks to the knee, clinching the lower back, striking with the inside of the glove, continuing to fight after the command of the referee, biting, spitting, eye pokes, approaching the opponent with a head held too low, avoiding to fight, or simulation of being hit by an illegal strike, submission holds and wrestling takedowns. For each foul, a fighter is awarded an official warning, with three warnings warranting a disqualification.

Match outcome
Effective strikes with permitted techniques are counted as scores. The scores are counted after the round and fighters are awarded based on a 10-point must system.

The fight can be temporarily stopped if the fighter is in knockdown, and the grounded fighter is given a long count. A knockdown awards a fighter a 10–8, two knockdowns a 10–7, and three knockdowns in a single round result in a technical knockout.

Weight classes
Enfusion currently uses nine different weight classes:

Events

Champions

Current champions
Enfusion men's championship

Enfusion women's championship

Enfusion Heavyweight World Championship
Weight limit: Unlimited

Enfusion Light Heavyweight Championship
Weight limit:

Enfusion Middleweight World Championship
Weight limit:

Enfusion Welterweight World Championship
Weight limit:

Enfusion Lightweight World Championship
Weight limit:

Enfusion Featherweight World Championship
Weight limit:

Enfusion Bantamweight Championship
Weight limit:

Enfusion Women's Openweight Championship
Unlimited

Enfusion Women's Featherweight Championship
Weight limit:

Enfusion Women's Bantamweight Championship
Weight limit:

Enfusion Women's Flyweight Championship
Weight limit:

Enfusion Women's Strawweight Championship
Weight limit:

Retired titles
Enfusion 95 kg World Championship

Enfusion 90 kg World Championship

Enfusion 80 kg World Championship

Enfusion 75 kg World Championship

Enfusion 72.5 kg World Championship

Enfusion 67 kg World Championship

Enfusion 60 kg World Championship

Enfusion 57 kg World Championship

Enfusion Women's 67 kg World Championship

Enfusion Women's 64 kg World Championship

Enfusion Women's 54 kg World Championship

Enfusion Women's 50 kg World Championship

Enfusion Reality
Enfusion Reality is a reality-style TV show in which contestants from different countries compete for cash prizes in the finals. Each season is a new competition, with different weight categories and new fighters. Each episode is set up to learn about each fighter, as they undertake small tasks in order to gain an advantage for their fight. At minimum, one fighter is eliminated in each episode. As the series draws to an end, the athletes are brought to the final 4 which compete in the final tournament.

Season 1, Test of the Champions – 2010 
In season 1, 18 professional fighters from around the world were gathered on the island of Ko Samui. They were divided into four teams chosen and led by four female captains. They competed against the three other teams composed of challengers in the 70MAX weight category. Final four fighters were: Pajonsuk, Gago Drago, Rick Barnhill and Armen Petrosyan and they fought in Lisbon. Pajonsuk defeated Armen Petrosyan by extra round decision, Gago Drago defeated Rick Barnhill by second-round knockout. Gago Drago became champion, defeating Pajonsuk in the finals by judges decision.

Season 2, Quest for honor – 2011 
For the second season, Enfusion introduced the 95MAX division. Once again, the contestants trained during the season on the island of Ko Samui. Final four fighters were: Mohamed Boubkari, Frank Munoz, Ondřej Hutník and Wendell Roche and they fought in Prague. Ondřej Hutník defeated Mohamed Boubkari by decision, Frank Munoz defeated Wendell Roche by decision. Ondřej Hutník became champion, defeating Frank Munoz in the finals by judges' decision.

Season 3, Trial of the Gladiators – Macedonia 2011 
The third season welcomes fighters from 18 different countries to Ohrid, Macedonia. The weight category of this tournament is from the 85-kilo division. The athletes were arranged into teams of four spearheaded by female captains. Both the male athletes and female athletes compete in an elimination tournament.

Season 4, Search for The Superpro - 2013 
This edition features some of the best up and coming world class kickboxers from the heavyweight division. The island of Koe Samui Thailand will host the extra large edition. Ladies from the 56-kilo division will assist in helping these athletes to complete there quest for dominance to crown the forth Enfusion Reality winner.

Season 5, Ladies edition - 2014 
This edition features 18 ladies from across the globe, in the 54-kilo division. These world-class ladies will compete in an elimination tournament to determine, who will become the next  Enfusion Reality champion. Iman Barlow the current Enfusion 54-kilo champion has her eyes set on winning this spectacular ladies tournament. The coaches are from the heavyweight division and will help aid these athletes through the competition, featuring Daniel Sam last years heavyweight winner. This edition comes from the island of Koe Samui Thailand from the super pro kickboxing and fighting camp.

Season 6, Celebs Meet Pros - 2016 
The sixth edition features 3 tournaments, the first features males who represent 4 different continents. with respective female captains. The contents represent are Europe, South America, Asia and Africa, and the Middle East. The female captains from these teams will also compete in a ladies tournament. The last tournament features a list of celebrities lambros Choutos , Stevie Raine, Glenn Helder , Ze Maria  who will fight in a pro kickboxing contest.

Season 7, New League Blood - 2017 
Enfusion Reality the seventh edition, “New League Blood” indulges viewers to two exhilarating 8-man tournaments: First 85-kilo and the second 72-kilo. The winner of the 85-kilo tournament will advance to the renowned Enfusion League tournament. The winner of 72-kilo will advance to the final 16 of the World Grand Prix 100,000-euro tournament. The female captains will also battle for prestige among the ladies division. The stakes for all the contestants have never been higher.

List of participants

Season 1 (2010)
 Coaches
 Bernise Alldis
 Catarina Valerio
 Eva Berben
 Titiana Van Polanen

 Contenders

 Gago Drago
 Shane Campbell
 Vuyisile Colossa
 Michael Lallemand
 Pasi Luukanen
 Mirko Vorkapic
 Şahin Yakut
 Cyrus Washington
 Alex Tobiasson
 Armen Petrosyan
 Jan van Denderen
 Steve Moxon
 Pajonsuk
 Goran Aleksic
 Rick Barnhill
 Barnabas Szücs
 Bruno Carvalho
 Ville Aalto

Women's final

Men's final −70 kg

Season 2 (2011)
 Coaches
 Julie Kitchen
 Maria Bastasin
 Aleide Lawant
 Hanna Mjoberg

 Contenders

 Frank Muñoz
 Sahak Parparyan
 Marc Vlieger
 Ramazan Ramazanov
 Miika Kinnunen
 Thiago Martina
 Ondřej Hutník
 Arnold Oborotov
 Fathi Cam
 Martin Jahn
 Bruno Lurette
 Wendell Roche
 Mohamed Boubkari
 David Radeff
 Narcis Omeragic
 Revanho Blokland

Women's final −63.5 kg

Men's final −95 kg

Season 3 (2012)
 Coaches
 Denise Kielholtz
 Hatice Ozyurt
 Lucy Payne
 Chajmaa Bellakhal
 Lindsay Scheer

 Contenders

 Adnan Omeragić
 Alexandros Chatzichronoglou
 Andrew Tate
 Bruno Lurette
 David Radeff
 Eddie Walker
 Franci Grajš
 Hakan Aksoy
 Jake Bostwick
 Michael Kongolo
 Peter Lapuc
 Ritchie Hocking
 Sahak Parparyan
 Ville Aalto
 Wendell Roche
 Sammy Masa
 João Oliveira]
 Urim Saiti

Women's final −57 kg

Men's final −85 kg

Season 4 (2013)
 Coaches
 Denise Kielholtz
 Manal Salman
 Vicky Church
 Miriam Hummingbird
 Anke Van Gestel

 Contenders

 Andrew Thomson
 Mate Paulovics
 Kirk Krouba
 Alexander Volobuev
 Daniel Sam
 Iggy McGowan
 Warren Thompson
 Brian Douwes
 Todd Stoute
 Pane Haraki
 Mohamed Boubkari
 Gaetan Sautron
 Chris Cooper
 Răzvan Ghiță
 Sam Tevette
 Wendell Roche
 Tomasz Nowak

Women's final −61 kg

Men's final HW

Season 5 (2014)
 Coaches
 Kirk Krouba
 Ashwin Balrak
 Lukasz Krupadziorow
 Andrew Thomson
 Daniel Sam

 Contenders

 Fatima Pinto
 Johanna Rydberg
 Ferial Ameeroedien
 Meryem Uslu
 Samantha van Doorn
 Soraya Haurissa
 Isis Verbeek
 Marina Zueva
 Filipa Correia
 Adi Rotem
 Tiffany van Soest
 Iman Barlow
 Ashley Nichols
 Lizzie Largillière
 Sammy Lee Brown
 Maria Pantazi
 Simone van Dommelen
 Nevenka Mikulić

Enfusion Reality champions

Enfusion seasons champions

See also
 List of kickboxing organizations

References

External links
 Enfusion official website

2010 Dutch television series debuts
2014 Dutch television series endings
Dutch reality television series
Kickboxing television series
Kickboxing organizations